Helium is a chemical element with symbol He and atomic number 2.

Helium may also refer to:

In science
Helium dating, a method of determining the age of rocks 
Helium fusion, a type of nuclear fusion in stars
Helium flash, the sudden beginning of helium fusion in certain kinds of stars
Isotopes of helium
Helium-3
Helium-4

Music
Helium (band), American rock band
Helium (Pram album), 1994
Helium (H3llb3nt album), 1998
Helium (Homeshake album)
"Helium" (Sia song), song from Fifty Shades Darker: Original Motion Picture Soundtrack
"Helium", song on the 1996 album West by Mark Eitzel
"Helium", song on the 1997 album The Answer Machine? by Skyclad
"Helium", song on the 1999 EP Total Eclipse of the Sun by Einstürzende Neubauten
"Helium", song on the 2002 album Comfort in Sound by Feeder
"Helium", 2002 song and single by the Dallas Superstars
"Helium", 2016 song and single by Mikey Wax
"Helium", 2016 song and single by Mikael Gabriel

Other
Helium (film), a 2014 short film
Helium, a fictional city-state in Edgar Rice Burroughs' Barsoom series of novels
The Late B.P. Helium, recording project and stage name of Bryan Poole
Helium Network, a decentralized wireless network

See also

Helios (disambiguation)
Heliu (disambiguation)
He (disambiguation)
Helius (fly), a genus of crane fly in the family Limoniidae